Sanghen is a commune in the Pas-de-Calais department in the Hauts-de-France region of France.

Geography
Sanghen is located 13 miles (22 km) south of Calais, at the junction of the D191 and D224 roads.

Population

Places of interest
 The church of St. Martin  dating from the fifteenth century.

See also
Communes of the Pas-de-Calais department

References

Communes of Pas-de-Calais